The golden otocinclus (Macrotocinclus affinis, formerly Otocinclus affinis) is one of the smallest known suckermouth catfish, often called a 'dwarf oto'. The close relatives of this small fish are often used for the purpose of controlling algae in small home aquariums, under the name Otocinclus affinis. In reality, they belong to the species O. vittatus, O. vestitus and O. macrospilus. The real M. affinis is not present in the aquarium hobby.

M. affinis is a Batesian mimic of Corydoras nattereri. Due to its narrow stripe, M. affinis resembles this Corydoras species more than it does  Otocinclus species.

M. affinis prefers an aquarium with fast moving water, sandy substrate, and plenty of hiding areas (old broken clay pipes is a preferred hiding habitat). This particular species is not as hardy as many of the other Otocinclus species.

See also
List of freshwater aquarium fish species

References
 

Aquabase.org

External links

Hypoptopomatini
Monotypic ray-finned fish genera
Fish of South America
Fish of Brazil
Endemic fauna of Brazil
Fishkeeping
Catfish genera
Taxa named by Isaäc J. H. Isbrücker
Fish described in 1877
Freshwater fish genera